Law enforcement in the Czech Republic is divided between several agencies. The main agency is the Police of the Czech Republic with general vested authority limited only in areas of operation of other authorities.

State Agencies

Municipal police

Any municipality in the Czech Republic, no matter how large or small, may decide to establish its own Municipal police ( or Městská policie in cities) by a local ordinance. Municipal police authority is generally limited to the area of given municipality, however neighboring municipalities may conclude agreement which extends authority of a given municipal police also over its territory (this is usually used by small municipalities located adjacent to large towns in order to save funds). Municipal police department is controlled by the mayor or another authorized member of the municipal council. The emergency phone number of the municipal police is 156.

Municipal police have jurisdiction over misdemeanors, supervise and protect the safety of citizens and properties, public order, collaborate within their competence with the state police in terms of safety on the roads, deal with offenses and other wrongs, etc. Officers of municipal police are armed and usually patrol on foot, bike, or car. Municipal police cannot investigate crimes and doesn't take investigations, municipal policemen secure the suspects on the scene (also can transport suspects to the nearest state police station) and hand the case further to the state police for investigation. Officers of the municipal police in large cities are the basic public order keepers. Many municipal police agencies have common radio frequency with the state police to provide better and quicker response. This system is highly used in larger cities where it often happens that several municipal and state police units arrive to the scene at the same time. Municipal police often conducts common safety policing campaigns with the state police. Cooperation in general is on very high level.

Unlike the state police officers, the municipal police officers are regarded as civilians. While in many other countries in Europe the municipal policemen are unarmed, the Czech municipal police officers all have firearms which they carry openly. Due to their civilian status they need to obtain a D category gun license in order to be able to be armed.

Rangers
Supervision of adherence to laws in specific areas is handed to authority of sworn rangers. Rangers are civilians who conduct their duties with vested public authority. 

Rangers generally have the authority to request identification of persons in their jurisdiction and issuing fines for breaches of respective laws. Due to their very limited authority, they may request assistance of municipal or state police when needed. When necessary, they may also detain a person until the state police arrives - anyone is legally obliged to obey ranger's order to wait for the arrival of state police. 

Rangers can be armed under the same rules as any other civilians, see Gun politics in the Czech Republic. Unlike members of Municipal Police, who are also considered civilians with vested public authority, rangers are obliged to carry their firearms concealed. Exception being Gamekeeper Rangers, who can carry their hunting rifles openly within a hunting area.

There four types of rangers in the Czech Republic, each of them being established by a separate act of law:
Environmental Rangers - jurisdiction in the area of protection of environment, most usually in the natural reserve areas or places where endangered species may be found
Forestry Rangers - jurisdiction in the area of usage of woods, especially as regards lumbering, reforestation, etc.
Gamekeeper Rangers - jurisdiction in the area of adherence to hunting laws
Fishing Rangers - jurisdiction in the area of adherence to fishing laws (freshwater fishing is very popular in the country)

See also
 Crime in the Czech Republic
 Czech Police Museum
 StB (Czechoslovak State Security) - Cold War
 Veřejná bezpečnost - Communist era police service

References 

 Municipal police of the Czech Republic - Městská policie - article about service of municipal (local) police in the cities of the Czech Republic